Langgöns is a municipality in the district of Gießen, in Hesse, Germany. It is situated 10 km south of Gießen.

Due to the town's convenient proximity to several former U.S. military bases; Ayers Kaserne, Giessen Army Depot, and Ray Barracks, the town was formerly home to community of several hundred Americans, primarily U.S. military and civilian personnel and their families.

Points of interest 
 Roman Limes Germanicus: A portion of the ancient Limes wall can still be found in the forest approximately 1 km to the south-west of the village near the A45. The ruins of the wall parallel a logging road heading north-south, extending southwards through the town of Butzbach, and continuing South-East towards the Taunus mountains and the ancient Roman fort of Saalburg. 
 Motor-cross: One of the largest motor-cross racing tracks in Hesse is located approximately 2 km South-West of the town directly off of the L3133 and behind the former U.S. military base of Ayers Kaserne.

References

External links
 

Giessen (district)